Feiseen was a  long steam yacht built in 1893 which set the water speed record on 25 August 1893 with a speed of .

History 
It displaced 13 tons and was powered by a quadruple expansion steam engine which could output .

On 1 November 1893, the Brazilian government purchased Feiseen for an estimated cost of $20,000. She had 9 feet added to her length, was renamed to Inhanduay and converted into a torpedo boat to be stationed on the Nictheroy.

References 

Steam yachts
Water speed records